Esperanza Tercero Rolando (born 27 October 1963) is a Spanish team handball player who played for the club BM Sagunto and for the Spanish national team. She was born in Ciudad Real. She competed at the 1992 Summer Olympics in Barcelona, where the Spanish team placed seventh.

References

1963 births
Living people
People from Ciudad Real
Sportspeople from the Province of Ciudad Real
Spanish female handball players
Olympic handball players of Spain
Handball players at the 1992 Summer Olympics